Byron Glasgow (born 18 February 1979) is an English footballer who plays as a midfielder. He began his career on the books at Arsenal before moving to Reading and graduating from the youth setup.

He made his debut in the FA Cup against Southampton on 4 January 1997 and scored his only goal for the club away at Notts County on 30 January 1999. He was sacked by Reading in 1999 after testing positive for cocaine and cannabis.

After leaving Reading he attracted interest from Swindon Town and had a trial at Northampton Town before joining Crawley Town on non-contract terms in November 1999. He has since gone on to represent a number of non league teams, playing for Walton & Hersham and St Albans City before joining Carshalton Athletic in March 2001. He joined Croydon Athletic in March 2003 but left the club a few months later in July.

On 9 December 2011 Glasgow joined Sussex County Football League side East Grinstead Town until the end of the season.

Career statistics (partial)

References

External links 
 

1979 births
Living people
Footballers from Greater London
English footballers
Reading F.C. players
Crawley Town F.C. players
Walton & Hersham F.C. players
St Albans City F.C. players
Carshalton Athletic F.C. players
Croydon Athletic F.C. players
English Football League players
Southern Football League players
Isthmian League players
East Grinstead Town F.C. players
Association football midfielders